St. Joseph Seminary can refer to:

Canada
St. Joseph Seminary (Edmonton)

Macau
St. Joseph's Seminary and Church

United Kingdom
St Joseph's College, Mark Cross, former seminary in East Sussex

United States
St. Joseph Catholic Seminary in Charlotte, North Carolina
Saint Joseph Seminary College in Covington, Louisiana
St. Joseph's Seminary and College (Dunwoodie) in Yonkers, New York
Saint Joseph College Seminary, former seminary in Chicago, Illinois
St. Joseph's Seminary (Callicoon, New York), former seminary in Callicoon, New York, listed on the National Register of Historic Places
St. Joseph's College (Santa Clara County, California), former Seminary in Mountain View, California
St. Joseph's Seminary (Washington, D.C.)

See also
Saint Joseph (disambiguation)
Saint Joseph's (disambiguation)
Saint Joseph's College (disambiguation)